Sędrowo  is a village in the administrative district of Gmina Wielbark, within Szczytno County, Warmian-Masurian Voivodeship, in northern Poland.

History
Sędrowo was founded by Albert, Duke of Prussia, in 1556 when an estate was granted to Martin Follert von Schlangenberg for services rendered to the Duke.

References

Villages in Szczytno County